Following the Battle of Chapultepec, Santa Anna withdrew his forces from Mexico City, leading a portion in an attempt to take Puebla and cut off Scott's supply route from Veracruz. The Siege of Puebla began the same day Mexico City fell to Winfield Scott and lasted for 28 days before a relief force fought its way into the city.

Background
General Winfield Scott had a series of garrisons posted along the route from Veracruz to Mexico City to protect his supply lines. One of these garrisons was posted at the city of Puebla, roughly two-thirds of the way to Mexico City from the coast. The garrison was commanded by Major Thomas Childs, serving as a brevet colonel. Childs had 500 soldiers to guard the city. After the fall of Mexico City, General Antonio López de Santa Anna renounced his presidency and split his forces, taking half of them to try to retake Puebla. General Joaquín Rea commanded the Mexican guerrilla forces in the area around Puebla.

Siege
On the night of 13–14 September 1847, Rea's forces entered the city with 4,000 men. The U.S. forces held the convent, Fort Loretto, and the citadel of San José. Lieutenant-Colonel Samuel W. Black, commander of the First Pennsylvania, was put in command of the citadel, which also served as a hospital for 1,800 sick and wounded soldiers. The Mexicans drove off most of the city's cattle, but Childs was able to save enough to keep from starvation. Rea demanded the garrison's surrender on 16 September, but Childs refused, leading Rea to attack San José, unsuccessfully. Childs repulsed a second attack on 18 Sept.

Santa Anna arrived on 22 September, launched a 500-man attack on the convent, once again unsuccessfully, yet called for Childs to surrender, which he refused. The attacks continued from 27 Sept. until 1 Oct.

At the end of September, Santa Anna departed with most of the Mexican forces to confront General Joseph Lane's relief column. Santa Anna was defeated at the Battle of Huamantla, allowing Lane to raise the siege on 12 Oct.

See also
 Battles of the Mexican–American War

References

Further reading
 Nevin, David; editor, The Mexican War (1978)

1847 in Mexico
Puebla
Puebla
Puebla
September 1847 events
October 1847 events